José Diego Pires (born 18 December 1981) is Brazilian football player, who plays as a defender or midfielder for Guarani.

He has a gifted left foot, as is one of the team's main free kick takers.
His father Waldir Peres played as goalkeeper for the Seleção.

External links

References

1981 births
Association football forwards
Living people
Brazilian footballers
Brazilian expatriate footballers
União Agrícola Barbarense Futebol Clube players
Esporte Clube Santo André players
FK Mladá Boleslav players
FC Karpaty Lviv players
ŠK Slovan Bratislava players
FC Petržalka players
Slovak Super Liga players
Rio Claro Futebol Clube players
Esporte Clube São Bento players
Guarani Esporte Clube (MG) players
Expatriate footballers in Slovakia
Brazilian expatriate sportspeople in Slovakia
Expatriate footballers in Ukraine
Brazilian expatriate sportspeople in Ukraine
Expatriate footballers in the Czech Republic
Brazilian expatriate sportspeople in the Czech Republic
Place of birth missing (living people)